Bushra Al-Bustani (Arabic:بشرى البستاني) is an Iraqi poet, critic and journalist who was born in Mosul and received her primary school at the Iraqi school, secondary school in Al Marifah Middle School and Central Prep Mosul. She then moved to Baghdad to complete her undergraduate studies in the Arabic Language Department of the Faculty of Education, University of Baghdad, and returned to Mosul after earning her bachelor's degree in honors to work as an Arabic language school in her schools.

Her family 
She and her family belong to the tribe of Tayy, Mosul, and they are from Iraq she gave birth to several political and social figures such as  Khalil Ismail Al-Bustani, Saad Khalil Ismail and Nidal Al-Bustani and they have close familial ties to the families of Sati' al-Husri and Rashid Ali al-Gaylani.

Her career 
She was named professor in 1998 and First Professor of Mosul University in 2000. During her scientific and cultural career, Al-Bustani participated in the work of more than 50 scientific conferences at Iraqi and Arab universities and more than 50 Iraqi, Arab and international cultural and creative conferences. Iraq was also represented at international and Arab scientific and creative conferences, including the International Women's Conference in Prague, the Conference on Culture and Arts in Germany and the Conference of Arab Women Creators in Tunisia, Beirut and Oman, which were addressed by Dr. Omar Al-Talib's Encyclopedia. She worked as an Arabic language school teacher and worked in the preparations of Mosul, the Teachers' House and the Teachers' Institute, and the Principal of the Kifah Middle School until 1981. She has served as Professor of Literature and Criticism at the Faculty of Arts/University of Mosul 1985 and continues to work in it. She supervised students' creative events in Nineveh education throughout her work. Participated in the cultural activities of mass organizations through their responsibility for the Culture, Media and Arts Committee of the General Federation of Women of Iraq 1974 to 1994. She served as a member of the Central Committee for the Supervision of General Ministerial Examinations at Mosul University. Responsible for supervising youth creative activities in literature at Mosul University from 1989 to present. Contributed to the writing of more than a dozen books in literature, criticism, society and human rights, including the book Al-Burda Forum, Women and Development, Citizenship Rights, Theatre in Mosul, Islamic Criticism and six books at the Festival of Al-Murbid Poetry in Baghdad from 1996 to 2002. Consultant in Rafidain Literature, Academic Education and Science. Editor-in-chief of a series because studies in language, literature and criticism issued by the Sayyab Foundation for Printing, Publishing, Distribution and Translation - London, Editor-in-Chief of the Cyber Letters Magazine of the Sayab Foundation, Editor of the Book of Deliberation in Linguistic and Critical Research. Recipient of the Medal of Science from the Ministry of Higher Education and Scientific Research twice and the Two-Time Medal of Creativity from the Ministry of Culture and the Arts, the Women's Badge from the General Federation of Iraqi Women, as well as more than forty discretionary certificates from Iraqi, Arab and international scientific and cultural institutions.

Her work 
 Post-Grief, Beirut, Renaissance 1973
 Song and Knife, Baghdad, 1975
 Me and the Bracelet, Mosul University, 1977
 Garden Blossom, Baghdad, 1983
 I accept Iraq's palm, Baghdad 1988
 The sea fishes the banks, Baghdad 2000
 Tree Pumps, Baghdad, 2002
 What the wind left, Damascus, 2002
 Booze Table Spin, Tigris House, Mosul 2004
 Andalusiat for Iraq's wounds, Beirut, 2010
 Eve's addresses, Cairo, 2010
 B. Ain, Amman, 2011
 Al-Wadd Book, Amman, 1011
 Five Ordeal, Amman 2012
 Night Phones, Stories, Amman, 2012

Books on literary criticism 
 Studies in Arab women's poetry, Amman, Balsam House - 1998
 Analysis of poetry, Algeria, Arabic Book House, 2002

Collaborations 
 Lists despite the blockade - Collaboration, Cairo, i 1, 2001
 Iraq Obelisk, Collaboration, General Federation of Literature, University of Mosul, 1994
 Mosul in the eyes of poetry, Mosul University, 2010

References 

21st-century Iraqi poets
20th-century Iraqi poets
1949 births
Linguists from Iraq
Iraqi women journalists
Iraqi women poets
University of Baghdad alumni
Iraqi academics
Living people
People from Mosul